Suitucancha (Hispanicized spelling of the Quechua term Suyt'u Kancha, suyt'u rectangular, kancha corral, square, "rectangular corral (or square)") is one of ten districts of the Yauli Province in Peru. Its seat is Suitucancha.

Geography 
The Paryaqaqa mountain range traverses the district. Other mountain are listed below:

See also 
 Putkaqucha

References